The Mill Valley Film Festival is an annual American film festival founded in 1977.

History
In October 1977, Mark Fishkin, Rita Cahill and Lois Cole organized a three-day film festival. It featured three film tributes, Francis Ford Coppola's The Rain People and George Lucas' Filmmaker. The first official festival took place in August 1978.

About the Festival
The San Francisco Bay Area continues to be a significant market for independent and international film, and MVFF provides a forum for introducing new films to West coast audiences.

Presented by the California Film Institute, the Mill Valley Film Festival takes place in early October. With a reputation for launching new films and creating awards season buzz, MVFF has earned a reputation as a 'filmmakers' festival" by celebrating the best in American independent and world cinema alongside high profile and prestigious award contenders.

Notable attendees have included Robin Williams, Jim Jarmusch, Kevin Smith, Jon Voight, Roberto Benigni, Alfre Woodard, Gael García Bernal, Helen Mirren, Steve McQueen, Annette Bening, Glenn Close, James Franco, Edward James Olmos, Jared Leto, Lily Taylor, Mike Leigh, Ben Stiller, Carey Mulligan, Mira Nair, Dustin Hoffman, Geoffrey Rush, Marcel Ophuls, Jane Russell, Les Blank, Barbet Schroeder, James Woods, Sissy Spacek, Jonathan Winters, Robert Altman, Nicholas Ray, Roger Corman, Jeanne Moreau, Karen Black, Barry Levinson, Sarah Silverman, Costa-Gavros, Jan Troell, William H. Macy, Milos Forman, Dianne Weist, Edward Norton, Uma Thurman, Alejandro González Iñárritu, Alan Arkin, Amanda Plummer, Darren Aronofsky, Laura Linney, Gena Rowlands, Albert Maysles, Donald Sutherland, John Sayles, Bradley Cooper, Jeff Daniels, Jean-Pierre Jeunet, Helena Bonham Carter, Derek Jacobi, Ismail Merchant, Carroll Baker, Malcolm McDowell, Joan Allen, Dick Cavett, Hilary Swank, Jason Reitman, John Hawkes, Laura Dern, Elle Fanning, Felicity Huffman, Clive Owen, Eddie Redmayne, Forest Whitaker, Ximena García Lecuona, Tim Robbins, Billy Bob Thornton, Sir Ian McKellen, Woody Harrelson, Harry Dean Stanton, John Walsh, Waldo Salt, Jennifer Jason Leigh, Ang Lee, Emma Stone, Ryan Gosling, Todd Haynes, Holly Hunter, Sean Penn, Danny Huston, Joe Wright, Peter Marshall, Dee Rees, Greta Gerwig, Margot Robbie, Allison Janney, Richard Linklater, Aaron Sorkin, Simon Curtis, Kristin Scott Thomas, Andrew Garfield, Connie Nielson, Catherine Hardwicke, Sean Baker, Jason Clarke, Sophie Nelisse, Lou Diamond Phillips, Brie Larson, Kenneth Branagh, Simon Rex, Denis Villeneuve, Jane Campion and Joe Wright.

Festival Sections include the World Cinema, US Cinema, Valley of the Docs, filmHOOD, 5@5 (shorts programs) and MVFF Music.

Festival Initiatives include Mind the Gap: Women | Film | Tech, Viva El Cine! and Active Cinema. 

The festival also features tributes and spotlights to acclaimed filmmakers, screenwriters and actors. Screenings are usually held at the Christopher B Smith Rafael Film Center in San Rafael, the Sequoia Theatre in Mill Valley, the Cinema in Corte Madera, and the Lark Theatre in Larkspur.

Screen International has named Mill Valley Film Festival a Top 10 US film festival. The 2020 Festival is scheduled for October 8–18, 2020.

References

External links

 
 California Film Institute

Film festivals in the San Francisco Bay Area
Mill Valley, California
Film festivals established in 1977
1977 establishments in California
Tourist attractions in Marin County, California